The Logging Creek Ranger Station is the oldest continually operating administrative site in Glacier National Park.  The rustic log cabin is an early example of what would become a typical style of western park structure. The district includes a cabin used as a residence for the summer fire guard.

The site would have been among those inundated by the proposed Glacier View Dam, which would have flooded much of the North Fork Flathead River valley, including park lands. Proposed in the 1940s, the dam was never built.

References

Ranger stations in Glacier National Park (U.S.)
Park buildings and structures on the National Register of Historic Places in Montana
Residential buildings completed in 1920
Rustic architecture in Montana
Historic districts on the National Register of Historic Places in Montana
National Register of Historic Places in Flathead County, Montana
National Register of Historic Places in Glacier National Park
Log cabins in the United States
Log buildings and structures on the National Register of Historic Places in Montana
1907 establishments in Montana
Residential buildings on the National Register of Historic Places in Montana